Oceanian Awakening (EO) is a political party in New Caledonia founded in March 2019.

History
The EO was founded in 2019 to compete in the 2019 New Caledonian legislative election. The aim as a party is to defend the interests of minority Wallisian residents and their descendants in New Caledonia. In the 1950s, a number of young workers from the Wallis and Futuna islands emigrated to New Caledonia in search of better economic opportunities and due to tense political and clan related violence. However, the EO considers the Wallis and Futuna community unrepresented in New Caledonia.  Ideologically, the party considers itself to be a centrist, pro-multi-ethnic party that supports non-violence. The EO is opposed to separatism for New Caledonia and has taken a neutral stance in the successive independence referendums, with party leader Milakulo Tukumuli stating “We haven’t created a movement to fight for independence or to fight for France – we’ve created a movement to fight poverty in New Caledonia." That's our struggle.” However, the party sits with the pro-separatist bloc in the Congress of New Caledonia in an electoral alliance with the Caledonian Union.

References 

Political parties in New Caledonia
Political parties established in 2019
Political parties of the French Fifth Republic
Ethnicity in politics